TBG may refer to:
Thyroxine-binding globulin, a transport protein
TBG AG, the investment arm of the Thyssen family
Traditional Britain Group, a far-right British pressure group 
Tønsberg, a city in Norway